The ACC–Big Ten Women's Challenge (or Big Ten–ACC Women's Challenge as it is called in alternating years) is an in-season NCAA Division I women's college basketball series established in 2007 that matches up teams from the Atlantic Coast Conference (ACC) and the Big Ten Conference. The challenge is identical in format to the men's ACC–Big Ten Challenge.

The ACC–Big Ten Women's Challenge occurs early in the season, typically around late November or early December. The games are hosted by each of the schools. Originally, 11 games were played in the challenge, meaning one team from the ACC did not play each challenge. Nebraska's entry to the Big Ten allowed all 12 teams in each conference to play in the challenge. However, conference expansion in 2013 and 2014 led the ACC to have 15 schools while the Big Ten had 14 schools, leaving one ACC team out of the challenge each season.

Many of the challenge games hosted by Big Ten schools are televised live by the Big Ten Network. Games hosted by ACC schools are televised by the ACC Network.

On November 28, 2022, amid ESPN losing its media rights to the Big Ten, it was announced that both the men's and women's series would be discontinued after the 2022–23 season. ESPN will arrange an ACC—SEC series as a replacement beginning in the 2023–24 season.

Team records
The Maryland Terrapins are listed under both the ACC and Big Ten standings, as they were members of the ACC during the Challenge from 2007 to 2013 and the Big Ten since 2014.

Atlantic Coast Conference (11–1–3)

Big Ten Conference (1–11–3)

Results

2022 ACC 8–6 
Source:

2021 ACC 10–4 

Source:

2019 Big Ten 9–5

2018 ACC 8–6

2017 ACC 10–4

2016 ACC 9–5

2015 Tied 7–7

2014 Tied 7–7

2013 ACC 7–5

2012 ACC 7–5

2011 Tied 6–6

2010 ACC 6–5

2009 ACC 7–4

Note: Miami did not play

2008 ACC 7–4

Note: Wake Forest did not play

2007 ACC 8–3

Note: Boston College did not play

References

External links
 https://web.archive.org/web/20120223170633/http://www.theacc.com/sports/w-baskbl/spec-rel/051407aac.html
 https://web.archive.org/web/20080705105138/http://theacc.com/sports/w-baskbl/acc-w-baskbl-body.html
 https://web.archive.org/web/20081218144951/http://bigten.cstv.com/sports/w-baskbl/big10-w-baskbl-body.html
 https://web.archive.org/web/20120404184925/http://www.theacc.com/sports/w-baskbl/spec-rel/120209aaa.html
 https://web.archive.org/web/20100706021316/http://www.bigten.org/sports/w-baskbl/spec-rel/052410aaa.html

Atlantic Coast Conference women's basketball
Big Ten Conference women's basketball
College women's basketball competitions in the United States
College basketball competitions